Philotheca papillata is a species of flowering plant in the family Rutaceae and is endemic to a restricted area of New South Wales. It is a small, erect, multistemmed shrub with glandular-warty, narrow elliptic leaves, and white to pale pink flowers arranged singly on the end of the stems.

Description
Flowering occurs in spring.

Taxonomy
Philotheca papillata was first formally described in 2006 by Ian Telford and Lachlan Copeland from specimens collected in the Sherwood Nature Reserve near Glenreagh in 2004.

Distribution and habitat
This philotheca grows in heath on sandstone in the Sherwood Nature Reserve near Glenreagh.

Conservation status
Philotheca papillata is listed as "vulnerable" under the New South Wales Government Biodiversity Conservation Act 2016.

References

papillata
Flora of New South Wales
Sapindales of Australia
Plants described in 2006
Taxa named by Lachlan Mackenzie Copeland